In mathematics, the Schuette–Nesbitt formula is a generalization of the inclusion–exclusion principle. It is named after Donald R. Schuette and Cecil J. Nesbitt.

The probabilistic version of the Schuette–Nesbitt formula has practical applications in actuarial science, where it is used to calculate the net single premium for life annuities and life insurances based on the general symmetric status.

Combinatorial versions

Consider a set  and subsets . Let

denote the number of subsets to which  belongs, where we use the indicator functions of the sets . Furthermore, for each , let

Let  denote a vector space over a field  such as the real or complex numbers (or more generally a module over a ring  with multiplicative identity).

Proof of 

We prove that holds pointwise. Take  and define .
Then the left-hand side of  equals .
Let  denote the set of all those indices  such that , hence  contains exactly  indices.
By the combinatorial interpretation of the binomial coefficient, there are   such subsets (the binomial coefficient is zero for ).
Therefore the right-hand side of  evaluated at  equals

Using the factorial formula for the binomial coefficients, it follows that

Rewriting (**) with the summation index  und using the binomial formula for the third equality shows that

which is the Kronecker delta.

Representation in the polynomial ring
As a special case, take for  the polynomial ring  with the indeterminate . Then can be rewritten in a more compact way as

Proof of  using: Substituting  for  into and using the binomial formula shows that

which proves.

Representation with shift and difference operators

and

Substituting  in  shows that

where we used that  with  denoting the identity operator. Note that  and  equal the identity operator  on the sequence space,  and  denote the -fold composition.

Then can be rewritten in a more compact way as

Probabilistic versions

Consider arbitrary events  in a probability space  and let  denote the expectation operator.

Similarly, and  yield

and, for every sequence ,

Remarks
In actuarial science, the name Schuette–Nesbitt formula refers to equation, where  denotes the set of real numbers.
The left-hand side of equation is a convex combination of the powers of the shift operator , it can be seen as the expected value of random operator . Accordingly, the left-hand side of equation is the expected value of random component . Note that both have a discrete probability distribution with finite support, hence expectations are just the well-defined finite sums.
If desired, the formulae,, and  can be considered in finite dimensions, because only the first  components of the sequences matter. Hence, represent the linear shift operator  and the linear difference operator  as mappings of the -dimensional Euclidean space into itself, given by the -matrices

and let  denote the -dimensional identity matrix. Then and  hold for every vector  in -dimensional Euclidean space, where the exponent  in the definition of  denotes the transpose.
The probabilistic versions, and  can be generalized to every finite measure space.

For textbook presentations of the probabilistic Schuette–Nesbitt formula and their applications to actuarial science, cf. .

History

For independent events, the formula appeared in a discussion of Robert P. White and T.N.E. Greville's paper by Donald R. Schuette and Cecil J. Nesbitt, see . In the two-page note , Hans U. Gerber, called it Schuette–Nesbitt formula and generalized it to arbitrary events. Christian Buchta, see , noticed the combinatorial nature of the formula and published the elementary combinatorial proof of ().

Cecil J. Nesbitt, PhD, F.S.A., M.A.A.A., received his mathematical education at the University of Toronto and the Institute for Advanced Study in Princeton. He taught actuarial mathematics at the University of Michigan from 1938 to 1980. He served the Society of Actuaries from 1985 to 1987 as Vice-President for Research and Studies. Professor Nesbitt died in 2001.

Donald Richard Schuette was a PhD student of C. Nesbitt, he later became professor at the University of Wisconsin–Madison.

More precisely, with  denoting the binomial coefficient,

and

see , Sections IV.3 and IV.5, respectively.

To see that these formulae are special cases of the probabilistic version of the Schuette–Nesbitt formula, note that by the binomial theorem

Expanding  using the binomial theorem and using equation (11) of the formulas involving binomial coefficients, we obtain

An application in actuarial science

Problem: Suppose there are  persons aged  with remaining random (but independent) lifetimes . How high is the expected payout of this insurance contract in  years?

Solution: Let  denote the event that person  survives  years, which means that . Use independence to calculate the probability of intersections.

An application in probability theory

Therefore, using, the probability-generating function of the number  of fixed points is given by

Therefore, as  tends to infinity, the distribution of  converges to the Poisson distribution with parameter .

See also
Rencontres numbers

References

External links

Enumerative combinatorics
Probability theorems
Theorems in statistics
Articles containing proofs